Pione (ピオーネ pione) is a large-berried, purple skinned, table and rosé wine grape variety that has been grown in Japan since 1957.

Table and wine producing grape
First developed in Shizuoka Prefecture by Hideo Ikawa, the grape is a hybrid tetraploid cultivar of the widely planted Kyoho and Cannon Hall Muscat grapes. Kyoho is itself a red fruited hybrid developed in Japan in 1937. The Cannon Hall Muscat is a large white table grape connected to seed originally brought from Greece in 1813, by John Spencer Stanhope resident of Cannon Hall near Barnsley, South Yorkshire, England.

Noted for large, generally seedless, purple skinned fruit. Grown in Okayama, Hiroshima, Nagano and Yamanashi Prefectures. Ranks third behind Kyoho and Delaware in terms of total volume of table grape production in Japan.

Commands a price premium as a table grape, but also occasionally used to produce rosé single varietal wine.

References 

Table grape varieties
Red wine grape varieties
Japanese fruit